"Sete" (stylized "SETE") is a single by South African rapper K.O featuring Young Stunna and Blxckie released on August 19, 2022 through Skhanda World and Sony, off SR3 (2022), as album's lead single. It was written by Ntokozo Mdluli, Sandile Msimango, Sihle Sithole. 

The song debuted at number one and has been certified double platinum by the RISA

Commercial performance 
"Sete" was certified gold in South Africa 5 days after its initial release and became the fastest surpassed 1 million streams on Spotify in South Africa. It peaked number 1 on Top 5 Spotify Charts. It also peaked number one on Radio Monitor Charts for 9 consecutive weeks.

The song reached platinum on September 14, 2022, sixteen days after release and double platinum on September 27.

Accolades 
The song won three awards includes Best Video, Song of the Year and Best Collaboration at the 2022 South African Hip Hop Awards. 

|-
| rowspan=3|2022 
|rowspan=3| "SETE" featuring Young Stunna and Blxckie 
| Song of the Year 
|  
|-
|Best Collaboration 
|
|-
|Best Video 
|

Charts

Certifications and sales

Release history

References 

2022 songs
2022 singles
Number-one singles in South Africa